These 125 species belong to the genus Homoeocerus, leaf-footed bug.

Homoeocerus species

 Homoeocerus abbreviatus (Fabricius, 1794)
 Homoeocerus abdominalis Distant, 1901
 Homoeocerus adustus Blöte, 1936
 Homoeocerus albiguttulus Stål, 1873
 Homoeocerus albiventris Dallas, 1852
 Homoeocerus angulatus Westwood, 1842
 Homoeocerus annulatus (Thunberg, 1822)
 Homoeocerus atkinsoni Distant, 1901
 Homoeocerus badgleyi Distant, 1908
 Homoeocerus bannaensis Hsiao, 1962
 Homoeocerus bequaerti Schouteden, 1913
 Homoeocerus bicolor Germar, 1838
 Homoeocerus bicoloripes Li, 1981
 Homoeocerus biguttatus Westwood, 1842
 Homoeocerus bipunctatus Hsiao, 1962
 Homoeocerus bipustulatus Stål, 1871
 Homoeocerus borneensis Distant, 1901
 Homoeocerus bredoi Schouteden, 1938
 Homoeocerus breviplicatus Bergroth, 1921
 Homoeocerus cingalensis (Stål, 1860)
 Homoeocerus cleio Linnavuori, 1974
 Homoeocerus cletoformis Hsiao, 1963
 Homoeocerus concisus Walker, 1871
 Homoeocerus concoloratus (Uhler, 1860)
 Homoeocerus dallasi Blöte, 1936
 Homoeocerus dan Villiers, 1950
 Homoeocerus delagoae Distant, 1902
 Homoeocerus dilatatus Horváth, 1879
 Homoeocerus discretus Bergroth, 1893
 Homoeocerus fasciatus Stål, 1871
 Homoeocerus fascifer (Stål, 1860)
 Homoeocerus fasciolatus Stål, 1873
 Homoeocerus fraternus Distant, 1908
 Homoeocerus freynei Schouteden, 1938
 Homoeocerus fuscicornis Horváth, 1893
 Homoeocerus glossatus Ahmad & Perveen, 1994
 Homoeocerus graminis (Fabricius, 1803)
 Homoeocerus gutta Dallas, 1852
 Homoeocerus herbaceus Bergroth, 1921
 Homoeocerus hulstaerti Schouteden, 1938
 Homoeocerus humeralis Hsiao, 1962
 Homoeocerus ignotus Schouteden, 1938
 Homoeocerus immaculatus Stål, 1871
 Homoeocerus immaculipennis Stål, 1873
 Homoeocerus impictus Hsiao, 1962
 Homoeocerus indus Distant, 1918
 Homoeocerus insignis Hsiao, 1963
 Homoeocerus insubidus Germar, 1838
 Homoeocerus javanicus Dallas, 1852
 Homoeocerus karschi Haglund, 1895
 Homoeocerus katangensis Schouteden, 1938
 Homoeocerus lacertosus Distant, 1889
 Homoeocerus laevilineus Stål, 1873
 Homoeocerus laterinotatus Blöte, 1936
 Homoeocerus limbatipennis (Stål, 1860)
 Homoeocerus limbatus Hsiao, 1963
 Homoeocerus lineaticollis Stål, 1873
 Homoeocerus lineaticornis Haglund, 1895
 Homoeocerus lineatus Walker, 1871
 Homoeocerus lucidus Walker, 1871
 Homoeocerus ludovicus Schouteden, 1938
 Homoeocerus luluensis Schouteden, 1938
 Homoeocerus macula Dallas, 1852
 Homoeocerus malayensis Distant, 1901
 Homoeocerus marginatus (Ahmad & Perveen, 1983)
 Homoeocerus marginellus (Herrich-Schäffer, 1840)
 Homoeocerus marginepunctatus Blöte, 1936
 Homoeocerus marginiventris Dohrn, 1860
 Homoeocerus maynei Schouteden, 1938
 Homoeocerus meniscus Hsiao, 1962
 Homoeocerus montanus Distant, 1901
 Homoeocerus nigridorsum Horváth, 1889
 Homoeocerus nota Blöte, 1936
 Homoeocerus ochraceus Blöte, 1936
 Homoeocerus ornaticollis Breddin, 1912
 Homoeocerus ornativentris Breddin, 1900
 Homoeocerus overlaeti Schouteden, 1938
 Homoeocerus pallens (Fabricius, 1781)
 Homoeocerus pallescens Blöte, 1936
 Homoeocerus pallidulus Blöte, 1936
 Homoeocerus pallidus Hesse, 1935
 Homoeocerus perpolitus Distant, 1902
 Homoeocerus perpunctatus Distant, 1902
 Homoeocerus picturatus Schouteden, 1938
 Homoeocerus plebejus (Stål, 1860)
 Homoeocerus ponsi Schouteden, 1913
 Homoeocerus prasinus (Germar, 1838)
 Homoeocerus puncticornis (Burmeister, 1834)
 Homoeocerus punctum Dallas, 1852
 Homoeocerus pupillatus Bergroth, 1921
 Homoeocerus relatus Distant, 1908
 Homoeocerus rubefactus Distant, 1902
 Homoeocerus rubromaculatus (Hsiao, 1963)
 Homoeocerus rufulus Blöte, 1936
 Homoeocerus schoutedeni Villiers, 1950
 Homoeocerus scutellatus Distant, 1902
 Homoeocerus serrifer (Westwood, 1842)
 Homoeocerus shokaensis Matsumura, 1913
 Homoeocerus simiolus Distant, 1902
 Homoeocerus simplex Walker, 1871
 Homoeocerus sinicus Walker, 1871
 Homoeocerus sticheli Bergroth, 1924
 Homoeocerus striicornis Scott, 1874
 Homoeocerus subjectus Walker, 1871
 Homoeocerus sumbawensis Blöte, 1936
 Homoeocerus tangens Blöte, 1936
 Homoeocerus taprobanensis Distant, 1902
 Homoeocerus tenuicornis Stål, 1873
 Homoeocerus tigrinus Hesse, 1925
 Homoeocerus tinctus Distant, 1883
 Homoeocerus trabeatus Hesse, 1925
 Homoeocerus uelensis Schouteden, 1938
 Homoeocerus unicolor Li, 1981
 Homoeocerus unipunctatus (Thunberg, 1783)
 Homoeocerus urbanus Stål, 1873
 Homoeocerus varicolor Xiong, 1987
 Homoeocerus ventriosus Hesse, 1925
 Homoeocerus vicarians Karsch, 1892
 Homoeocerus virescens Villiers, 1973
 Homoeocerus viridis Hsiao, 1962
 Homoeocerus viridulus Ren, 1993
 Homoeocerus walkeri Kirby, 1892
 Homoeocerus walkerianus Lethierry & Severin, 1894
 Homoeocerus wealei Distant, 1893
 Homoeocerus yunnanensis Hsiao, 1962

References

Homoeocerus